The Haina Occidental Port (often referred to as "Rio Haina") is located in the Haina River,  Dominican Republic near Santo Domingo. President Trujillo inaugurated Haina Occidental Port on 1953.

Overview

Haina Port has two terminals, which are located on either side of the Haina River. The older terminal is called Haina Occidental Terminal (which is the current name of the Port), and the newer terminal is named Haina Oriental Terminal.

According to a statistical report submitted by Dominican Port Authority (APORDOM) for January to June 2017, Multimodal Caucedo Port had 66.3% of TEU (Twenty-foot Equivalent Unit) movement in the island, followed by Rio Haina Port with 27.4%, and the other ports in the Dominican Republic handling 6.1%.

Port information
 HAI - HAINA
Local time: UTC−4
 Weather/climate/prevailing winds:  From May 15 until September 15
 Climate: mostly sunny, tropical. Hurricane season runs from June to November
 Prevailing winds: direction ENE–ESE
 Average temperature range: 28–30 °C

See also 
 List of ports and harbours of the Atlantic Ocean

References 
 Haina Port info (English)

Notes

Ports and harbours of the Dominican Republic
Urban planning in the Dominican Republic
Buildings and structures in San Cristóbal Province